Drahichyn District is an administrative subdivision, a raion of Brest Region, in Belarus. Its administrative center is Drahichyn.

Demographics
At the time of the Belarus Census (2009), Drahichyn Raion had a population of 42,948. Of these, 95.1% were of Belarusian, 2.1% Russian and 2.1% Ukrainian ethnicity. 82.1% spoke Belarusian and 16.0% Russian as their native language.

References

 
Districts of Brest Region